Victor Kendall (26 September 1903–date unknown) was a British screenwriter notable for his work in the 1930s. Kendall wrote the screenplay for Atlantic the first sound portrayal of the Titanic Disaster. Kendall worked for several British studios and production companies but spent most of his screenwriting career with the large British International Pictures organisation where he wrote scripts for several of the companies leading directors such as Ewald André Dupont and Thomas Bentley. According to IMDb, this was the same person who proceeded to an acting career in the United States, commencing as one of the not-specifically named (and distinctly mature-looking) "Students" in the 1939 Laurel and Hardy film A Chump at Oxford. Other films through to 1943 in which an actor of this name appeared are listed in the same source. Against this background, it might be noted that there are no England and Wales birth records for any Victor Kendall in 1903, no sign of emigration to the United States in the 1930s, and no evidence of a person with such a name and approximate date of birth in the 1940 US Census. In that context, the lack of information on the death of this film-industry worker looks unsurprising.

Selected filmography
 Weekend Wives (1928)
 Atlantic (1929)
 Atlantik (1929)
 High Seas (1929)
 The Copper (1930)
 Young Woodley (1930)
 Night Birds (1930)
 Atlantis (1930)
 Cape Forlorn (1931)
 Potiphar's Wife (1931)
 The Maid of the Mountains (1932)
 Sleepless Nights (1932)
 Love and Luck (1932)
 Dick Turpin (1933)
 Heads We Go (1933)
 Meet Mr. Penny (1938)
 Night Alone (1938)
 Save a Little Sunshine (1938)
 Dead Men Are Dangerous (1939)                                                                                                                                                                       
 A Chump at Oxford (1940)

References

Bibliography
 Low, Rachael. History of the British Film: Filmmaking in 1930s Britain. George Allen & Unwin, 1985 .
 Richards, Jeffrey. A Night to Remember: the Definitive Titanic Film: A British Film Guide''. I.B.Tauris, 2002.

External links

1903 births
Year of death missing
British male screenwriters